Batzra is a moshav in central Israel. Located in the Sharon plain near Ra'anana, it falls under the jurisdiction of Hof HaSharon Regional Council.

History
Before the 20th century the area formed part of the Forest of Sharon. It was an open woodland dominated by Mount Tabor Oak, which extended from Kfar Yona in the north to Ra'anana in the south. The local Arab inhabitants traditionally used the area for pasture, firewood and intermittent cultivation. The intensification of settlement and agriculture in the coastal plain during the 19th century led to deforestation and subsequent environmental degradation.

The moshav was established in 1946 by demobilised soldiers who had received technical training in the British Army. It was named after Basra in Iraq, where the unit was stationed for some time during World War II. By 1947 it had a population of 80. It was repopulated by South African Jewry.  Batzra extends onto the land of the former village of Tabsur.

References

Moshavim
Agricultural Union
Populated places established in 1946
Jewish villages in Mandatory Palestine
Populated places in Central District (Israel)
1946 establishments in Mandatory Palestine
South African-Jewish culture in Israel